Anolis cuprinus, also known commonly as the copper anole, the Chiapas anole, and el abaniquillo de Chiapas in Spanish, is a species of lizard in the family Dactyloidae. The species is endemic to Mexico.

Geographic range
A. cuprinus is found in southeastern Mexico, in the Mexican states of Chiapas and Oaxaca.

Habitat
The preferred natural habitat of A. cuprinus is montane cloud forest, but the species has also been found in coffee plantations.

Description
The dewlap is bright red, and reaches mid-thorax. The interparietal scale is distinctly smaller than the ear opening.

Reproduction
A. cuprinus is oviparous.

Etymology
The synonym, A. breedlovei, was named in honor of American botanist Dennis Eugene Breedlove.

References

Further reading
Casas-Andreu G, Méndez-de la Cruz FR, Aguilar-Miguel X (2004). "Anfibios y Reptiles ". pp. 375–390. In: García-Mendoza AJ, Ordóñez-Díaz MJ, Briones-Sales M (editors) (2004). Biodiversidad de Oaxaca. México, Distrito Federal: Universidad Nacional Autónoma de México, Instituto de Biología World Wildlife Fund; Oaxaca, Oaxaca: Fondo Oaxaqueño para la Conservación de la Naturaleza. 605 pp. . (in Spanish).
Smith HM (1964). "A New Anolis from Oaxaca, Mexico". Herpetologica 20 (1): 31–33. (Anolis cuprinus, new species).
Smith HM, Paulson DR (1968). "A New Lizard of the scheidi group of Anolis from Mexico". Southwestern Naturalist 13 (3): 365–368. (Anolis breedlovei, new species).

Anoles
Reptiles described in 1964
Taxa named by Hobart Muir Smith
Endemic reptiles of Mexico